Back is the name of a 1983 studio album by country music singer Lynn Anderson.

The album marked Anderson's returnas the title impliedafter a three year hiatus to start a family with her second husband, Harold "Spook" Stream, and to raise her three children (one from a previous marriage and two with Stream). Anderson and Stream divorced in 1982, prompting her to return to her music career in 1983.

Anderson had left her previous record company, Columbia Records, when she "retired" in 1980. She signed with Permian Records, and worked with producer Michael Clark, to make the Back album.

Three singles were released from this album, all in 1983. The first, "You Can't Lose What You Never Had", just missed the Billboard Country Top 40 at No. 42.  The next single, "What I Learned from Loving You", peaked at No. 18 on the Billboard country charts. The third and final single, "You're Welcome to Tonight", was a duet with 1980s country star Gary Morris and the album's most successful single, peaking at No. 9 on in early 1984.

The album reached No. 61 on the Top Country Albums chart in 1983.

Track listing 
 "You Can't Lose What You Never Had"
 "Love Comes Around Again"
 "What I Learned from Loving You"
 "Your Kisses Lied"
 "At This Moment"
 "Fool for Love"
 "Heartbreak Kid"
 "This Time the Heartbreak Wins"
 "Mr. Sundown"
 "You're Welcome to Tonight" (with Gary Morris)

Personnel
Background Vocals: Lynn Anderson, Stephen Brantley, Bruce Dees, Marsha Wood
Bass guitar: Larry Paxton
Drums: Clyde Brooks
Duet Vocals: Gary Morris on "You're Welcome to Tonight"
Guitar: Mark Casstevens, Michael Clark, Bruce Dees, Doyle Grisham, Dann Huff, Dan Roth, Michael Spriggs, Chip Young
Harmonica: Terry McMillan
Keyboards: Mitch Humphries, Buddy Skipper
Lead Vocals: Lynn Anderson
Steel Guitar: Sonny Garrish, Weldon Myrick
Synthesizer: Michael Clark

Chart performance

1983 albums
Lynn Anderson albums